Boz is a commune in the Ain department in eastern France.

Population

See also
Communes of the Ain department
Chizerots

References

External links

 Gazetteer Entry

Communes of Ain
Ain communes articles needing translation from French Wikipedia
Bresse